Shubh Kadam is an Indian television series that aired on Sahara One

Plot
The story revolves around Pratha, who is haunted by an evil spirit after her marriage to Raghav, causing vengeance on her family.

Cast
 Mahhi Vij as Pratha
 Prateek Shukla as Raghav
 Prabha Sinha as Raghav's Mother 
 Priyamvada Sawant as Chitra (Raghav's widowed sister-in-law)
 Dev Keswani as Swayam (Tenant at Raghav's house who plays love interest to Chitra)
 Sudha Chandran as Raghav's Biological Mother 
 Suresh Marathe as Diwakar Deshmukh 
 Anubha Bhonsale as Pratha's Stepsister 
 Nazneen Patel 
 Rupal Patel
 Abhay Shukla

References

Indian television soap operas
Sahara One original programming
2009 Indian television series debuts
2009 Indian television series endings